Jemila Wumpini Abdulai is a Ghanaian blogger, writer and digital marketer. In 2007, she founded Circumspecte.com, a lifestyle blog dedicated to Africans. Her blog was a recipient of the African Blogger Awards in 2016.

In 2015, Jemila's short story,  "Yennenga" was included in the Caine Prize Anthology 2015 book: "Lusaka Punk and Other Stories." The book also featured other 16 short stories by African authors.

Personal life 
Jemila is the daughter of Mohammed-Sani Abdulai, the vice president of Madina Institute of Science and Technology, Accra.

Education 
Jemila had her secondary education at Wesley Girls' High School   in Cape Coast, Ghana, and graduated from Mount Holyoke College in Massachusetts, USA where she double majored in Economics and French.

She further earned a Master of Arts degree in International Economics and International Relations from the Johns Hopkins University SAIS in Washington DC, USA.

Advocacy 
She is an advocate for women's rights in Ghana, and also vocal on social media, on topics concerning technology, women's empowerment, and national development. Jemila is also the organiser of #SisterhoodMatters, an annual event in Ghana that celebrates African women and creates conversations about women's health and wellbeing.

In 2016, Jemila Abdulai, the social media lead of BloggingGhana – a group of Ghanaian bloggers, helped in the collation and dissemination of non-partisan news on Ghana's 2016 General Elections via social media. This was under the initiative "Ghana Decides." Jemila Abdulai stated that their goal was to present an unbiased view on the elections: "Traditional media in Ghana has a reputation for being politicized, particularly during elections. That's why social media initiatives like Ghana Decides are important."

Jemila Abdulai was one of the speakers at TEDxAccraWomen conference held on 28 October 2016 in Accra, Ghana.

References

Ghanaian mass media people
Dagomba people
Year of birth missing (living people)
Living people
Ghanaian bloggers
Ghanaian women bloggers
Mount Holyoke College alumni